Give Me Liberty is a 2019 American comedy drama directed by Kirill Mikhanovsky. The film had its world premiere on the opening night of the Sundance Film Festival on January 24, 2019. The film had its world premiere in the Directors' Fortnight section at the 2019 Cannes Film Festival.

The film stars Chris Galust, Lauren "Lolo" Spencer, and Maxim Stoyanov.

Summary
The film follows medical transport driver Vic as he shuttles his Russian grandfather and émigré friends to a funeral.

Cast
 Chris Galust as Vic
 Lauren "Lolo" Spencer as Tracy
 Maxim Stoyanov as Dima
 Darya Ekamasova as Sasha
 Zoya Makhlina as Vic's Mom
 Sheryl Sims-Daniels as Tracy's Mom
 Anna Maltova as Anna
 Arkady Basin as Vic's Grandpa
 Michael Earvin as the Cadillac Man

Reception

Critical response 
The site's critical consensus reads: "Give Me Liberty expertly juggles resonant themes and a madcap series of events to produce a chaotic comedy with heart."

Writing in The New York Times, Manohla Dargis describes Give Me Liberty as “a jolt of a movie, an anarchic deadpan comedy that evolves into a romance just around the time the story explodes…It’s irresistible,” while Variety calls it “a boisterous, free-wheeling joyride.” Matt Fagerholm describes it as “Electric. A Fresh all-American crowd pleaser.”

Accolades
The film received four Independent Spirit Award nominations, including for Best Male Lead (Galust), Best Supporting Female Actress (Spencer), Best Editing (Mikhanovsky), and Best Feature Under $500,000 (John Cassavetes Award), winning in the last category.

It was the winner of Macau IFF 2019 (Best International Picture).  It was named to the following “Best Of” lists:  The Washington Post, The New York Times, The Los Angeles Times, National Board of Review, NPR (David Lapin), The Hollywood Reporter, and RogerEbert.com (Sundance Best Performances).

References

External links
 

2019 films
2019 comedy films
American comedy films
2010s English-language films
2010s Russian-language films
Films about buses
Films about disability
Films set in Wisconsin
2019 multilingual films
American multilingual films
2010s American films
John Cassavetes Award winners